Natalia Pulido (born 17 December 1969) is a Spanish swimmer who competed in the 1992 Summer Olympics.  She attended the University of Nevada, Reno and was a member of the swimming & diving team.

References

1969 births
Living people
Spanish female freestyle swimmers
Olympic swimmers of Spain
Swimmers at the 1992 Summer Olympics
Nevada Wolf Pack women's swimmers
Mediterranean Games silver medalists for Spain
Mediterranean Games medalists in swimming
Swimmers at the 1991 Mediterranean Games
20th-century Spanish women